Cameron D. Robinson (born October 9, 1995) is an American football offensive tackle for the Jacksonville Jaguars of the National Football League (NFL). He played college football at Alabama.

High school career 
A native of West Monroe, Louisiana, Robinson attended West Monroe High School, where he was a two-time first team 5A Louisiana All-State selection by the Louisiana Sports Writers Association. In his senior season, West Monroe finished with a 9–3 record, losing to Central in the second round of the LHSAA Class 5A state playoffs. After the season, Robinson was named All-American by USA Today and Parade.

One of the most highly regarded recruits across all positions, Robinson was unanimously considered the No. 1 offensive tackle prospect of his class. With offers from almost every program in the nation, Robinson chose Alabama over Louisiana State. He graduated from high school in January to enroll at Alabama for the spring semester.

College career 
In his true freshman season at Alabama, Robinson started all 14 games. He was the first true freshman to start at left offensive tackle for the Crimson Tide since Andre Smith in 2006. Over a total of 861 snaps, Robinson surrendered only three quarterback sacks. He was part of an offensive line that gave up just 1.14 sacks per game, which ranked 14th nationally, while blocking for 484.5 yards of total offense per game. Robinson was named a Freshman All-American by Football Writers Association of America. After playing three years with Alabama, Robinson decided to forgo his senior year and enter the 2017 NFL Draft.

Professional career 
Robinson received an invitation to the NFL Combine and completed all the combine drills except for the bench press, due to a shoulder injury. He participated at Alabama's Pro Day and opted to only run positional drills for team representatives and scouts. NFL draft experts and analysts projected Robinson to be a first or second round pick. He was ranked the top offensive tackle by Sports Illustrated, the second best offensive tackle by NFL media analyst Bucky Brooks, the second best interior offensive lineman by Mike Mayock, and was ranked the third best offensive tackle by ESPN and NFLDraftScout.com.

The Jacksonville Jaguars selected Robinson in the second round (34th overall) of the 2017 NFL Draft. He was named the Jaguars starting left tackle as a rookie in 2017, starting 15 games.

In Week 2 of the 2018 season against the New England Patriots, Robinson suffered a torn ACL and was placed on injured reserve on September 17, 2018. In Week 3 of the 2020 season against the Miami Dolphins on Thursday Night Football, Robinson was ejected after making contact with a referee.

The Jaguars placed the franchise tag on Robinson on March 9, 2021, and he signed the one-year tender on April 9.

The Jaguars placed the franchise tag on Robinson for a second time on March 8, 2022, before eventually agreeing to a three-year contract extension worth $54 million on April 27, 2022.

Personal life 
On May 17, 2016, Robinson was arrested for possession of marijuana and weapons charges in West Monroe, Louisiana. According to the police booking information, he was charged with two misdemeanors, possession and illegal carrying of a weapon, as well as felony possession of stolen firearms. The charges were dropped on June 20, 2016 by the district attorney because of insufficient evidence. District Attorney Jerry D. Jones said "I want to emphasize once again that the main reason I'm doing this is that I refuse to ruin the lives of two young men who have spent their adolescence and teenage years, working and sweating, while we were all in the air conditioning."

References

External links 
 
 Jacksonville Jaguars bio
 Alabama Crimson Tide bio

1995 births
Living people
Alabama Crimson Tide football players
All-American college football players
American football offensive tackles
Jacksonville Jaguars players
People from West Monroe, Louisiana
Players of American football from Louisiana
Ed Block Courage Award recipients